Echeverría is a surname of Basque origin (spelled Etxeberria in that language) and that is widespread in Spanish-speaking countries.

Notable people
 Atanasio Echeverría y Godoy (1771–1803), Mexican botanical artist and naturalist
 Bernardino Echeverría Ruiz (1912–2000), Roman Catholic cardinal
 Esteban Echeverría (1805–1851), Argentine writer and political activist
 Francisco de Borja Echeverría (1848–1904), Chilean Conservative Party deputy and diplomat
 José Antonio Echeverría (1932–1957), Cuban revolutionary and student leader
 Liza Echeverría (b. 1972), Mexican actress and model
 Luis Echeverría Álvarez (1922–2022), president of Mexico (1970–1976)
 Rob Echeverria (b. 1967), American guitarist
 Sandra Echeverría (b. 1981), Mexican actress and singer

Company
 Star Bonifacio Echeverria, Spanish manufacturer of small arms
 Patricio Echeverría, SA (PESA), long-standing company in the steel industry in the Basque province of Gipuzkoa, Spain

Metropolis trains
 Echeverría metro station, a ghost station on Santiago Metro Line 4A
 Echeverría (Buenos Aires Underground), a station on the Buenos Aires Subway

See also
 Echevarria (disambiguation)
 Etcheverry (disambiguation)
 Etxeberria
 Echeveria

Basque-language surnames